Jeanie McLean, formerly known as Jeanie Dendys, is a Canadian politician, the current deputy premier of Yukon since 2023. She was elected to the Legislative Assembly of Yukon in the 2016 election. She represents the electoral district of Mountainview as a member of the Yukon Liberal Party.

Prior to entering territorial politics, McLean was the Director of Justice for the Kwanlin Dün First Nation. She has served in numerous advisory capacities, including the Yukon Policing Review and the review of the Yukon Corrections system. McLean also served for four years as the Yukon representative to the RCMP Commissioner's First Nation Policing Advisory Board.

McLean defeated Yukon Premier Darrell Pasloski in his riding of Mountainview on November 7, 2016. On December 3, 2016, she was sworn in as the Yukon Minister of Tourism and Culture, as well as the Minister responsible for the Women's Directorate and the Minister responsible for the Yukon Workers' Compensation Health and Safety Board. She is currently also a member of the Standing Committee on Appointments to Major Government Boards and Committees.

McLean is born and raised in the Yukon and of Tahltan First Nation and Norwegian ancestry.

The Hon. Jeanie McLean was previously known as the Hon. Jeanie Dendys. She changed her surname in September 2020.

Electoral record

Yukon general election, 2016

|-

| Liberal
| Jeanie Dendys
| align="right"| 439
| align="right"| 34.6%
| align="right"| +14.5%

| NDP
| Shaunagh Stikeman
| align="right"| 432
| align="right"| 34.0%
| align="right"| -1.0%

|-
! align=left colspan=3|Total
! align=right| 1,270
! align=right| 100.0%
! align=right| –
|}

References

Yukon Liberal Party MLAs
Women MLAs in Yukon
First Nations women in politics
Living people
Politicians from Whitehorse
21st-century Canadian politicians
21st-century Canadian women politicians
Members of the Executive Council of Yukon
Women government ministers of Canada
Year of birth missing (living people)
First Nations politicians